Thupparivaalan 2 is an upcoming Indian action thriller detective film produced, directed and starred by Vishal. A sequel to the 2017 film Thupparivaalan, it also stars Prasanna and Ashya. The music will be composed by Ilaiyaraaja. Vishal makes his directorial debut with this film earlier being directed by Mysskin, who withdrew from the project due to creative differences and financial issues.

Cast

Production 
Principal photography began in early November 2019 at Bristol, and the first schedule wrapped a month later. After Mysskin and Vishal drifted apart over budget issues, filming resumed in November 2020 with Vishal as the primary director of the film. The film is planned to resume shooting in March of 2023 so that the film can release on 12 August 2023.

Music 
The music of the film will be composed by Ilaiyaraaja.

References

External links 
 

Upcoming films
Upcoming Tamil-language films
Upcoming directorial debut films
Indian action thriller films
Indian detective films
Indian sequel films
Films scored by Ilaiyaraaja